Sydney Charles Allicock (born 1954) was minister of Indigenous People's Affairs in Guyana from 2015-2020, and was vice-president of Guyana from 2015-2020.

Career 
Allicock was born in North Rupununi, Upper Takutu-Upper Essequibo region. he was elected Toshao (chief) of the Annai, in Region No. Nine, the North Rupununi in 1989. He is currently the chairman of the North Rupununi District Development Board. 

His father was one of the founders of the Iwokrama International Centre for Rain Forest Conservation and Development and Allicock has been one of the key tutors in their training program.

He pioneered Amerindian Heritage Day, which was later adopted as a national event.

From May 2015 to August 2020, he served as Minister of Indigenous Peoples' Affairs and one of the vice presidents in the cabinet of David A. Granger representing the Guyana Action Party.

Recognition 
In 2010, Allicock was the recipient of the Anthony N. Sabga Caribbean Awards for Excellence for his public service work. 

He received the Responsible Tourism Showcase Award from the US Educational Travel Conference, New Orleans, in 2009.

In 2020, Sydney Allicock Highway was commissioned and named in his honor. The highway runs through the Rupununi, starting from Central Lethem and running through Hiawa, Nappi and Parashara.

References

Living people
Guyanese people of indigenous peoples descent
People's National Congress (Guyana) politicians
Vice presidents of Guyana
Government ministers of Guyana
Members of the National Assembly (Guyana)
Year of birth missing (living people)
People from Upper Takutu-Upper Essequibo